The 2022 season was the Atlanta Falcons' 57th in the National Football League (NFL), their sixth playing their home games at Mercedes-Benz Stadium and their second under head coach Arthur Smith.

The Falcons matched their 7-10 record from the previous season, but failed to qualify for the fifth consecutive season after a Week 16 loss to the Baltimore Ravens along with wins by the Saints and Panthers.

Despite the setbacks, the Falcons defeated quarterback Tom Brady for the first time ever in his career during the last game of the regular season, avenging their Super Bowl LI loss. Also notable for the first time since 2007, long-time quarterback Matt Ryan is not on the roster as the Falcons shipped him off to play for the Indianapolis Colts on March 21, 2022. The team signed former Tennessee Titans and Las Vegas Raiders quarterback Marcus Mariota as their new quarterback on the same day. Mariota was reunited with Falcons head coach Arthur Smith, who served as the tight ends coach and offensive coordinator during Mariota's tenure with the Titans (2015–2019).

Draft

Draft trades

Staff

Final roster

Preseason
The Falcons' preseason opponents and schedule were announced in the spring.

Regular season

Schedule

Note: Intra-division opponents are in bold text.

Game summaries

Week 1: vs. New Orleans Saints

Week 2: at Los Angeles Rams
{{Americanfootballbox
|titlestyle=;text-align:center;
|state=autocollapse
|title=Week 2: Atlanta Falcons at Los Angeles Rams – Game summary
|date=September 18
|time=4:05 p.m. EDT/1:05 p.m. PDT
|road=Falcons
|R1=0|R2=3|R3=7|R4=17
|home=Rams
|H1=7|H2=14|H3=7|H4=3
|stadium=SoFi Stadium, Inglewood, California
|attendance=71,802
|weather=Cloudy, 
|referee=Clay Martin
|TV=Fox
|TVAnnouncers=Kevin Kugler, Mark Sanchez and Laura Okmin
|reference=Recap, Game Book
|scoring=
First quarter
 LAR – Allen Robinson 1-yard pass from Matthew Stafford (Matt Gay kick), 1:44. Rams 7–0. Drive: 9 plays, 66 yards, 5:10.
Second quarter
 LAR – Darrell Henderson 8-yard run (Matt Gay kick), 9:30. Rams 14–0. Drive: 8 plays, 50 yards, 4:41.
 ATL – Younghoe Koo 26-yard field goal, 2:44. Rams 14–3. Drive: 11 plays, 67 yards, 6:46.
 LAR – Cooper Kupp 3-yard pass from Matthew Stafford (Matt Gay kick), 0:14. Rams 21–3. Drive: 3 plays, 9 yards, 0:14.
Third quarter
 LAR – Cooper Kupp 10-yard pass from Matthew Stafford (Matt Gay kick), 9:22. Rams 28–3. Drive: 10 plays, 75 yards, 5:38.
 ATL – Drake London 4-yard pass from Marcus Mariota (Younghoe Koo kick), 3:20. Rams 28–10. Drive: 5 plays, 20 yards, 3:03.
Fourth quarter
 LAR – Matt Gay 20-yard field goal, 12:13. Rams 31–10. Drive: 13 plays, 78 yards, 6:07.
 ATL – Olamide Zaccheaus 11-yard pass from Marcus Mariota (Younghoe Koo kick), 8:14. Rams 31–17. Drive: 8 plays, 72 yards, 3:59.
 ATL – Lorenzo Carter 26-yard return of blocked punt (Marcus Mariota–Drake London pass), 4:57. Rams 31–25.
 ATL – Brandon Powell OB in end zone, forced by DeAundre Alford, for a Safety, 0:06. Rams 31–27.
|stats=
Top passers
ATL – Marcus Mariota – 17/26, 196 yards, 2 TD, 2 INT
LAR – Matthew Stafford – 27/36, 272 yards, 3 TD, 2 INT
Top rushers
ATL – Cordarrelle Patterson – 10 rushes, 41 yards
LAT – Darrell Henderson – 10 rushes, 47 yards, TD
Top receivers
ATL – Drake London – 8 receptions, 86 yards, TD 
LAR – Cooper Kupp – 11 receptions, 108 yards, 2 TD

Week 3: at Seattle Seahawks

Week 4: vs. Cleveland Browns

Week 5: at Tampa Bay Buccaneers

Week 6: vs. San Francisco 49ers

Week 7: at Cincinnati Bengals

Week 8: vs. Carolina Panthers

Week 9: vs. Los Angeles Chargers

Week 10: at Carolina Panthers

Week 11: vs. Chicago Bears

Week 12: at Washington Commanders

Week 13: vs. Pittsburgh Steelers

Week 15: at New Orleans Saints

Week 16: at Baltimore Ravens

Week 17: vs. Arizona Cardinals

Week 18: vs. Tampa Bay Buccaneers

Despite this game having no playoff implications for either team, the Falcons beat the Buccaneers 30-17, officially getting the franchise's first ever victory against Tom Brady. The game featured several milestones for the Falcons rookie class. Quarterback Desmond Ridder threw his first (and second) career touchdown pass, running back Tyler Allgeier passed the 1,000 yard rushing mark while setting the franchise rookie record, and wide receiver Drake London passed tight-end Kyle Pitts for the most receptions by a rookie in franchise history. Following their victory and the rest of the Week 18 results, the Falcons secured the 8th spot in the 2023 NFL Draft.

Standings

Division

Conference

Team leaders

NFL rankings

References

External links
 

Atlanta
Atlanta Falcons seasons
Atlanta Falcons